Han Seok-jong (born 19 July 1992) is a South Korean footballer who plays as midfielder for Suwon Samsung Bluewings.

Career
He signed with Gangwon FC on 13 December 2013.

In 2017, he joined Incheon United FC.

References

External links 

1992 births
Living people
Association football midfielders
South Korean footballers
Gangwon FC players
Incheon United FC players
Gimcheon Sangmu FC players
K League 1 players
K League 2 players
Soongsil University alumni